Marko Horvatin (14 October 1919 – 13 March 2011) was a Croatian rower. He competed in the men's coxed pair event at the 1948 Summer Olympics.

References

1919 births
2011 deaths
Croatian male rowers
Olympic rowers of Yugoslavia
Rowers at the 1948 Summer Olympics
Sportspeople from Zagreb